Sigvald Asbjørnsen (August 20, 1867 – September 8, 1954)  was a Norwegian-born American sculptor.

Background
Sigvald Asbjørnsen was born in Christiania (now Oslo), Norway. Asbjørnsen studied art with Mathias Skeibrok  (1851–1896) and Julius Middelthun and under Brynjulf Bergslien. At the age of 16 he was awarded a stipend from King Oscar II to study at the Royal Academy in Oslo where he worked for five years.

Career
Sigvald Asbjørnsen emigrated to the United States in 1892, first working in Michigan where he received several important commissions for sculpture. He eventually moved to Chicago where he worked on the buildings for the World Columbian Exposition of 1893. The remainder of his professional career was spent in Chicago where he sculpted a number of public works which were sent to various localities in the United States. He also made medallions of Bjørnstjerne Bjørnson, Henrik Ibsen and Edvard Grieg among others.  Asbjørnsen exhibited sculptures at the Art Institute of Chicago between 1897 and 1921. He received the Royal Norwegian Order of St. Olav in 1952 from Norway’s King Haakon VII.

Asbjørnsen died at his son's home in Chicago in 1954.

A collection of his work is at the Vesterheim Norwegian-American Museum in Decorah, Iowa. His sculptural work was shown at the University of Minnesota exhibit "The Divided Heart: Scandinavian Immigrant Artists, 1850–1950" in 1982.

Selected works
Benjamin Franklin, Lincoln Park, Chicago, Illinois, 1895–96.
Illinois State Monument, Chickamauga and Chattanooga National Military Park, Chattanooga, Tennessee, 1898–99.
Statue of Leif Erikson, Humboldt Park, Chicago, Illinois, 1901.
War, and Soldier (corner figure), General William Tecumseh Sherman Monument, President's Park, Washington, D.C., ca. 1901–02. Asbjørnsen created the figure of War, and completed one of Carl Rohl-Smith's four soldier figures.
Pennsylvania State Monument, Andersonville National Historic Site, Andersonville, Georgia, 1902–05.
Louis Joliet, Joliet Public Library, Joliet, Illinois, 1903–04.
Bjørnstjerne Bjørnson Monument, North Dakota State University, Fargo, North Dakota, 1904.
Macon County Soldiers' Monument, Central Park, Decatur, Illinois, 1904–05.
John R. Monaghan Monument, Riverside Avenue & Monroe Street, Spokane, Washington, 1906.
Soldiers' and Sailors' Monument, Jefferson County Courthouse, Madison, Indiana, 1907–08.
Whitehead Memorial Fountain (R.D. Whitehead Memorial), Bow Street & Chavez Drive, Milwaukee, Wisconsin, 1910. A granite watering trough adorned with a bronze bas-relief of a horse.
Wilbur Fisk Sanders, Montana State Capitol, Helena, Montana, 1911–13.
Edvard Grieg Memorial, Prospect Park, Brooklyn, New York, 1914.
Relief bust of Roald Amundsen, Golden Gate Park, San Francisco, California, ca. 1914–20.
Augustus Pollack Monument, Ohio County Courthouse, Wheeling, West Virginia, 1916.
Bust of Benjamin Franklin.
Bust of Theodore Roosevelt.

References

Other sources
Strand, A.E.  (1905) A History of the Norwegians in Illinois (Chicago, IL: John Anderson Publishing Co.)
Sundby-Hansen, Harry   (1921) Norwegian Immigrant Contributions to America’s Making (New York, NY: International Press)
 Haugan, Reidar Rye (1933) Prominent Artists and Exhibits of Their Work in Chicago (Chicago Norske Klub. Nordmanns-Forbundet, 24: 371–374, Volume 7) 
Heitmann, Helen M.  (1976) From Fjord to Prairie: Norwegian-Americans in the Midwest, 1825–1975 (Chicago, IL: Norwegian-American Immigration Anniversary Commission)

External links
Leif Erickson statue In the Humboldt Park, Chicago
Edvard Grieg statue in Prospect Park, Brooklyn
Bjørnstjerne Bjørnson monument at North Dakota State University

1867 births
1954 deaths
Artists from Chicago
Norwegian emigrants to the United States
Norwegian artists
Artists from Oslo
20th-century American sculptors
19th-century American sculptors
19th-century American male artists
American male sculptors
Sculptors from Illinois
20th-century American male artists